The Golden Morning Breaks is an album by Colleen, released in 2005. It takes on a more natural and less synthetic sound than its predecessor, 2003's Everyone Alive Wants Answers, which was almost entirely sampled. The cover art is by Iker Spozio.

A video was made by Jon Nordstrom for the song "I'll Read You a Story".

Track listing
"Summer Water" – 3:39
"Floating in the Clearest Night" – 2:36
"The Heart Harmonicon" – 3:53
"Sweet Rolling" – 4:04
"The Happy Sea" – 3:00
"I'll Read You a Story" – 6:51
"Bubbles Which on the Water Swim" – 3:11
"Mining in the Rain" – 3:11
"The Golden Morning Breaks" – 5:22
"Everything Lay Still" – 13:18

References

External links
 The Leaf Label's page for the album

Colleen (musician) albums
2005 albums
The Leaf Label albums